|}

This is a list of House of Assembly results for the 1947 South Australian state election.

Results by electoral district

Adelaide 

 Preferences were not distributed.

Albert

Alexandra 

 Preferences were not distributed.

Angas

Burnside

Burra

Chaffey

Eyre

Flinders

Frome

Gawler

Glenelg 

 Preferences were not distributed.

Goodwood

Gouger

Gumeracha

Hindmarsh

Light 

 Preferences were not distributed.

Mitcham

Mount Gambier

Murray

Newcastle

Norwood

Onkaparinga 

 Preferences were not distributed.

Port Adelaide

Port Pirie

Prospect

Ridley

Rocky River

Semaphore

Stanley 

 Preferences were not distributed.

Stirling

Stuart

Thebarton

Torrens

Unley

Victoria

Wallaroo

Yorke Peninsula

Young

See also
 Candidates of the 1947 South Australian state election
 Members of the South Australian House of Assembly, 1947–1950

References

1947
1947 elections in Australia
1940s in South Australia